Pisolithus hypogaeus is a fungus in the genus Pisolithus, occurring in coastal south-western Australia in association with eucalypt ectomycorrhizal hosts on sandy soils. DNA samples show that Pisolithus hypogaeus is a relative of other brown- and echinulate-spored Pisolithus species, and is most closely related to two undescribed epigeous Pisolithus species from Australia.

References

Boletales